The Isenberg School of Management is the business school and also the second largest school/college at the University of Massachusetts Amherst, the flagship campus for the University of Massachusetts system, located in Amherst, Massachusetts, United States.  The Isenberg School is accredited by the AACSB International and ACPHA.

The school offers seven undergraduate majors along with MS, MBA and Ph.D. programs. As of the 2014-2015 academic year, there were approximately 3500 undergraduate students and 1300 graduate students enrolled in the Isenberg School of Management. Isenberg students have wide access to campus resources including over 30 student organizations in the Isenberg School itself, and many more across campus. The school also has a dedicated Chase Career Center, a career and professional development resource tailored especially for the needs of business students.

Currently,  the Isenberg School has nearly 44,000 alumni in 72 countries, many of whom are involved in the school in a variety of ways. The current and former alumni include CEOs of Fortune 500 companies including General Motors, Deutsche Bank, and T-Mobile and also heads of athletic teams and sports organization's such as Harvard Crimson and USA Gymnastics.

History

Business courses were first offered at the Massachusetts Agricultural College in the early years of the 20th century, expanding rapidly during the 1930s and 1940s in response to student demand. The college's board of trustees established the School of Business Administration in 1947, and within seven years, it was conferring graduate degrees, including doctorates after 1967. The school was accredited at the undergraduate level by the Association to Advance Collegiate Schools of Business in May 1958, and in March 1959, the board of trustees authorized the establishment of four academic departments within the school: Accounting, General Business and Finance, Management, and Marketing. In September 1967, a program leading to the degree of PhD in Business Administration was introduced.

In 1964, the school moved to its current building in the heart of the UMass Amherst campus. In 1983, the School of Business Administration changed its name to School of Management. In 1998 the Isenberg School of Management was named after Eugene Isenberg, the chairman and CEO of Nabors Industries, which at the time was a world leader in gas and petroleum drilling. 

Isenberg's gift was the largest contribution from an individual in UMass Amherst's history, and facilitated the school's campaign to build its 42,000-square-foot Harold Alfond Management Center addition, and established several endowed chairs for the campus.

Modern expansion
The business school completed and opened a 70,000-square-foot expansion in 2019. The project was estimated at $62 million and added classrooms, labs, and student-facing spaces.

Rankings

Graduate level
At the MBA level, in 2020 and 2023 U.S. News & World Report ranked Isenberg 53rd overall, and ranked its online MBA program 28th. Financial Times has ranked its online MBA program at 3rd worldwide and  1st in the United States for the years 2017, 2018, 2019, and 2020. In 2023, Financial Times has ranked its online MBA program at 5th worldwide and 2nd in the United States.

Individual departments
In 2019, Public Accounting Report’s Annual Professors Survey has ranked the college under top 30 for undergraduate, graduate, and Ph.D. accounting programs.

The McCormack Department of Sport Management has been ranked among top 2 graduate-level sports management program for the fourth time in the world by SportBusiness International. 

In 2014, Forbes called the sports management department "a world-wide leader in its field". 

The school's Hospitality & Tourism Management Department was ranked #32 in the world in 2020 by CEOWORLD magazine.

Academics

Undergraduate programs
BBA with major in:
Accounting
Finance
Management 
Marketing
Operations and Information Management
B.S. in Hospitality and Tourism Management
B.S. in Sport Management

Graduate programs
MBA with core curriculum in:
Accounting/Finance
Management
Business Analytics
Operations/Information Management
Marketing
M.S. in Accounting
M.S. in Sport Management

Doctorate programs
Ph.D. with concentration in:
Accounting
Finance
Hospitality and Tourism Management
Management Science
Information Systems
Marketing
Organization Studies
Sport Management
Strategic Management

MBA and masters program
Isenberg offers full-time, part-time and online programs for its AACSB-accredited MBA degree. The school has the second largest MBA degree program in the Commonwealth of Massachusetts by total enrolled students.

The full-time MBA is a two-year residency program at the UMass Amherst flagship campus. The first-year curriculum focuses on core business disciplines with thematic strength in business analytics, organizational problem solving, and change management; the second year includes consulting/practicum projects, as well as elective courses that allow students to build a focus in areas such as Finance (in areas such as investment management, risk and compliance), Marketing (analytics and public policy), Healthcare Administration, Sport Management, or Entrepreneurship.

Isenberg offers Dual MBA/MS degrees in six disciplines: Public Policy and Administration, Sport Management, Civil Engineering, Environmental Engineering, Industrial Engineering, and Mechanical Engineering. The part-time MBA can be taken in face to face satellite locations in Boston, Shrewsbury or  Springfield, as well as fully online. The master's degree in Healthcare Administration is partnered with American Association for Physician Leadership.

Isenberg also awards M.S. degrees in Accounting and Sport Management.

Isenberg Fellows Residential Academic Program (RAP)
The Isenberg Fellows RAP is divided into two different groups. Students of the Business in Society Fellows will explore how businesses operate in and impact a community. It will highlight the social responsibilities that businesses have, including ethics and community service. The other group is called the Diversity & International Business Fellows, and these students will learn about the global and diversity issues that businesses are facing today.

Isenberg Honors Residential Academic Program (RAP)
The Isenberg Honors RAP has similar features and benefits to the Fellows RAP, but is specifically geared toward students who are both a member of the Isenberg School of Management and also the Commonwealth Honors College. Students will live together with other members of the RAP and also take a year-long seminar led by the Isenberg School of Management Undergraduate Dean.

Research
Researchers at the business school are leading a three-year project that is creating infrastructure and logistics planning models for the 2022 FIFA World Cup.

Research centers
The Isenberg School of Management hosts numerous research centers including;
Berthiaume Center for Entrepreneurship
McCormark Center for Sports Research and Education (MCSRE)
Center for International Securities and Derivatives Markets (CISDM)
Massachusetts Small Business Development Center
Virtual Center for Supernetworks

Student clubs and organizations
Students have over 30 organizations to choose from at the Isenberg School. Each student organization is paired with a faculty advisor and receives support from the entire Isenberg School community. 

UMass Investment Banking Club
Accounting Association
ADS
Advancement of Diversity in Business
AH&LA
American Marketing Association
Beta Alpha Psi
Business Law Club
CMAA
Eta Sigma Delta
Delta Sigma Pi
Finance Society
FBMA
INFORMS
Investment Club
Isenberg Honors Council
Isenberg Undergraduate Consulting Group
Isenberg Management Association 
 Isenberg Marketing Club
Isenberg Operations & Information Club
ITCC
IWiB
Jewish Leaders in Business
MEMA
Minutemen Alternative Investment Fund
Minutemen Equity Fund
Minutemen Fixed Income Fund
NABA
Net Impact
Networking Club
NSMH
OUT@Isenberg
Real Estate Club
ULead
UMASSM
UMass Real Estate Club
WISM

Donor programs
In 2014, alumni Douglas and Diana Berthiaume donated $10 million to the university to establish Berthiaume Center for Entrepreneurship and further in 2023, they donated $20 million to support and expand faculty research and endow new faculty positions and professorships.

Notable alumni

Business 

 Anshu Jain (1985), former Global co-CEO of Deutsche Bank
 Marc Forgione, owner of restaurant Marc Forgione in New York City
 John F. Smith, Jr. (1960), former CEO and Chairman of General Motors Corporation
 Hina Rabbani Khar (2001), 30th Foreign Minister of Pakistan
 Julie Robenhymer, former Miss New Jersey
 V. Anantha Nageswaran, 18th Chief Economic Adviser to the Government of India
 Susan Fournier, Dean of Questrom School of Business
 David Fubini (1976), Senior Lecturer at Harvard Business School
 Müjde Yüksel, Associate Professor at Suffolk University
 Vivek Paul, Adjunct Professor at Stanford University.
 Dennis Hanno, President of Wheaton College
 James Pallotta (1979), President of A.S. Roma and Chairman and Managing Director of Raptor Group
 Jeff Taylor 2001, founder of Monster.com
 John Legere, CEO and President of T-Mobile US
 Rudolf Rodríguez, former Minister of Finance and Public Credit of Colombia
 Earl W. Stafford, founder of the Stafford Foundation

Sports and athletics

Serena Williams, 4x Olympic Gold Medalist and 23x Grand Slam winning tennis player 
 Jay Monahan, 4th Commissioner of the PGA Tour
 Li Li Leung (2003), President and CEO of USA Gymnastics
 Tony Barbee (1993), collegiate basketball coach at Auburn University
 Ben Cherington (1997), Former executive Vice President and General Manager of the Boston Red Sox
 Dave Jauss, professional baseball coach
 Neal Huntington (1992), General Manager of the Pittsburgh Pirates
 Dave Littlefield (1984), Senior Vice President and General Manager of the Pittsburgh Pirates
 Arturo Guevara, baseball writer
 Mike Tannenbaum (1991), former general manager of the New York Jets
 Adam Breneman, American football tight end and college football commentator

Medicine 

 J. Michael Millis, Professor of Surgery and Vice Chair of Global Surgery at University of Chicago.
 Bernard Lee (professor) (2011), Professor of Surgery at Harvard Medical School
 Muhammad Ali Chaudhry, Adjunct Assistant Professor at Johns Hopkins School of Medicine
 Marc Laufgraben (2009), Chairman of Monmouth Medical Center

Armed forces and police 

 Robert Miller, 24th Surgeon General of the United States Air Force and the United States Space Force
Samantha Sepulveda - Long Island police officer
 Brian G. Neal, Major General (R) in the United States Air Force
 Mark MacCarley, Major General (R) in the United States Army

Honorary alumni 
 Wayne Chang (Hon. D.B.), Co-founder of Crashlytics

Notable faculty

Executive-in-Residence
 David Stern, 4th Commissioner of the National Basketball Association
 Anita DeFrantz, member of the International Olympic Committee

Tenured faculty, endowed professors and chairs
 Nefertiti Walker, Associate Professor
 Thomas Schneeweis, retired Michael and Cheryl Philipp Professor of Finance
 Sheila Bair, retired Visiting Professor of Finance, Chair Board of directors of Fannie Mae
 Hossein Kazemi, Michael and Cheryl Philipp Professor of Finance
 Anna Nagurney, John F. Smith Memorial Professor of Operations Management
 Linda Smircich, Professor of Management

See also
 List of United States graduate business school rankings
 List of business schools in the United States

References

Explanatory notes

Citations

External links

 
 BIG's copper-and-glass-clad "Isenberg School Expansion falls into place", The Architect's Newspaper, 2019

1947 establishments in Massachusetts
Business schools in Massachusetts
Educational institutions established in 1947
Universities and colleges in Hampshire County, Massachusetts
University of Massachusetts Amherst schools
University subdivisions in Massachusetts